Safe is a British television drama series created by crime author Harlan Coben and written primarily by screenwriter Danny Brocklehurst. Set in England, the series is a production by Canal+, with C8 airing the show in France, and Netflix streaming the show internationally outside France. The series began filming in Manchester, Liverpool, and Cheshire in July 2017. It consists of eight episodes that premiered in 190 countries on 10 May 2018.

Plot
Safe focuses on Briton Tom Delaney (Hall), a pediatric surgeon and widowed father of two teenage daughters. He is struggling to connect with his daughters as they still grieve the loss of his wife from cancer one year prior. After his 16-year-old daughter Jenny goes missing, Tom uncovers a web of secrets as he frantically searches for her.

Cast and characters
 Michael C. Hall as Tom Delaney, widower of wife Rachel, surgeon
 Amanda Abbington as Sophie Mason, Detective Sergeant partnered to Emma, Tom's girlfriend and neighbour
 Amy James-Kelly as Jenny Delaney, 16, Tom's elder daughter, girlfriend to Chris
 Isabelle Allen as Carrie Delaney, Tom's younger daughter
 Marc Warren as Pete Mayfield, Tom's best friend and fellow doctor
 Hannah Arterton as Emma Castle, Detective Constable relocated from the big city
 Emmett J. Scanlan as Josh Mason, Sophie's ex-husband who lives in a trailer-camper parked in her driveway
India Fowler as Ellen Mason, Sophie's daughter 
 Louis Greatorex as Henry Mason, Sophie's teenage son
 Freddie Thorp as Chris Chahal, Zoé and Neil's son, and Jenny's 19-year-old boyfriend
 Audrey Fleurot as Zoé Chahal, mother of Chris, French teacher accused of impropriety
 Joplin Sibtain as Neil Chahal, Zoé's husband
Imogen Gurney as Tilly Chahal, Zoé and Neil's daughter
 Amy-Leigh Hickman as Sia Marshall, Jenny's drug-dealing classmate
 Nigel Lindsay as Jojo Marshall, Sia's father
 Laila Rouass as Lauren Marshall, Sia's mother
 Milo Twomey as Archie "Bobby" Roberts, owner of a 1980s-themed bar called Heaven
 Hero Fiennes Tiffin as Ioan Fuller, a teenager who may know something about Jenny's disappearance
 Karen Bryson as Helen Crowthorne, next-door neighbour to the Delaney family

Episodes

Critical response
Safe has received positive reviews. It has a 71% approval rating on review aggregator Rotten Tomatoes, based on 24 reviews. While British newspapers The Daily Telegraph and The Guardian found Hall's "odd" English accent to be a metaphor of overall peculiarities with the series, they both found many elements of the show to be entertaining. Ed Power wrote in The Daily Telegraph that Harlan Coben "makes every one of his characters feel plausibly sinister and throws in plenty of skilfully crafted cliff-hangers. Netflix's latest can be hackneyed and is written to formula, but the central mystery is assembled with a watchmaker's eye and the entire fandango whirrs by with ruthless efficiency." The Guardians Sam Wollaston wrote, "What looked at one point like it might be Netflix's Broadchurch – the disappearance of a teenager, a parent's anguish, the effect on a community, the police investigation – soon starts to look more like Desperate Housewives. I'm very much enjoying these people, without really caring about them."

Maureen Ryan of Variety praised the series, writing, "It's a highly watchable, semi-pulpy serial loaded with reveals, clues and cliffhangers, and the core cast is generally quite good." Ben Travers of IndieWire found the series entertaining and graded it a B, writing, "Safe leans into most of its increasingly preposterous moments, including Hall's accent. It's not that the show or its star’s elocution are bad, per se; they just don’t overwork themselves trying to convince you of their grand importance. Safe is a soap, and it's a fun diversion as such."

Daniel Fienberg of The Hollywood Reporter, who based his review on the first two episodes sent to critics, criticised Hall's accent and performance, the depiction of teens and other elements of the series as all off-tone. Fienberg wrote, "It could take watching the six additional episodes to know if there's a cliché-upending payoff or if Safe is just a muddle."

References

External links
 

French-language Netflix original programming
English-language Netflix original programming
Canal+ original programming
2018 French television series debuts
2018 American television series debuts
2018 British television series debuts
2010s British crime drama television series
2010s British mystery television series
2018 French television series endings
2018 American television series endings
2018 British television series endings
British thriller television series
Crime thriller television series
Serial drama television series
Television series about dysfunctional families
Television series by Red Production Company
Television series by StudioCanal